The 2015 Four Nations Tournament was the fourteenth edition of the Four Nations Tournament, an invitational women's football tournament held in China.
The tournament was won by Canada.

Participants

Venues

Final standings

Match results

References 

2015 in women's association football
2015
2015 in Chinese football
2015 in South Korean football
2014–15 in Mexican football
January 2015 sports events in China
2015 in Chinese women's sport